The Fifth Form at St. Dominic's is a 1921 British silent drama film directed by A. E. Coleby. It is based on the 1881 novel The Fifth Form at St. Dominic's by Talbot Baines Reed.

Cast
 Sam Austin as Ben Cripps  
 Clifford Cobbe as Mr. Rastle  
 Percy Field as Horace Wrayford  
 Ralph Forbes as Oliver Greenfield  
 William Freshman as Loman  
 Douglas Phair as Tony Pembury  
 Milton Royce as Mr. Jellicot  
 Phyllis Shannaw as Nancy Senior  
 Cecil Susands as Bullinger  
 Maurice Thompson as Stephen Greenfield  
 Humberston Wright as Dr. Senior

References

Bibliography
 Low, Rachael. History of the British Film, 1918-1929. George Allen & Unwin, 1971.

External links
 

1921 films
1921 drama films
British drama films
British silent feature films
Films directed by A. E. Coleby
Films set in England
Films based on British novels
British black-and-white films
1920s English-language films
1920s British films
Silent drama films